The Journal of Environmental Quality is a bimonthly peer-reviewed scientific journal publishing original research in the area of anthropogenic impacts on the environment, including terrestrial, atmospheric and aquatic systems. According to Journal Citation Reports, the journal has a 2020 impact factor of 2.751. It was established in 1972 as the first joint publication of the not-for-profit American Society of Agronomy, Crop Science Society of America, and Soil Science Society of America. The journal is currently published by the three societies in partnership with Wiley. The journal was a quarterly publication for the period of 1972 to 1993. Since 1994 it has been a bimonthly publication journal. Since 2013, it is available online only.

References

English-language journals
Environmental science journals